Iran participated at the 2017 Summer Universiade in Taipei, Taiwan.

medal summary

medal by sports

Archery

Fencing

Taekwondo

Volleyball

Weightlifting

Wushu

Archery

Men

Women

Mixed

Badminton

Women

Fencing

Men

Women

Judo

Men

Taekwondo

Kyorugi

Nations at the 2017 Summer Universiade
2017 in Iranian sport
2017